RNZAF Security Forces is the Royal New Zealand Air Force unit responsible for base security, ground defence, weapons training, and Air Transport Security on RNZAF aircraft. RNZAF Security Forces operates under the RNZAF Operations Squadron.

RNZAF Security Forces are more commonly known in the RNZAF simply as SECFOR. They have a similar role to other Air Force units such as USAF Security Forces, RAAF Security Force Squadrons, and the RAF Regiment however it is smaller in size compared to their UK, American and Australian counterparts. The primary role of RNZAF Security Forces is to provide the Air Force with security of aircraft and personnel, as well as protection of airfields.

Military Working Dog unit
The Military Working Dog (MWD) unit provides a further security function, and works closely with their Security Forces team members. The MWD unit was first established in 1972 as part of the RNZAF Police when the RNZAF purchased six P-3 Orions; due to the high tech nature of systems and equipment on these aircraft, the RNZAF Police military working dogs were seen as the most effective form of security.

The MWD unit holds extra responsibility for RNZAF aircraft and plays an important role in protecting them from sabotage and acting as a deterrent around RNZAF bases or when deployed overseas.

The Military Working Dogs for the unit are usually sourced from the New Zealand Police, all the dogs are Belgian malinois or German Shepherds. There are plans to expand the MWD unit due to the purchases of new P-8 Poseidon and C-130J Super Hercules aircraft.

The Military Working Dog unit is a specialisation and personnel are selected for this role once they have completed at least two to three years as a Security Forces Operator. Currently the Military Working Dog unit is located at RNZAF Base Auckland with plans in the future to expand the dog unit to RNZAF Base Ohakea.

History
RNZAF Security Forces traces its lineage back to the amalgamation of RNZAF Police and General Service Instructors in 1999. Over the years the unit has seen various name and role changes. Today RNZAF Security Forces primary job is air base protection, security, and weapons training for RNZAF personnel.

Air Security Police

In 1999–2001 many areas of the Air Force underwent significant change, cost saving and disbandment. The RNZAF Police was no exception and in a controversial move this saw the amalgamation of general service instructors (GSIs) with the RNZAF Police; subsequently many RNZAF Police and GSIs left the service shortly after the almagamation.

The RNZAF moved away from a sole focused policing role, and specialised more in ground defence and base security with policing as a secondary service. A name change to Air Security Police was adopted and the new unit was deployed to East Timor in 1999/2000. However, this proved to be an inauspicious start for the new trade that ended with the Air Security deployment being the subject of a court of inquiry. This inquiry found severe organisational and management problems stemming from a lack of leadership and resentment towards the amalgamation of the two trades. Underlying issues of direction, focus and responsibilities continued to dog the new trade for several years.

Force Protection

In 2010 following the civilianisation of many trades in the RNZAF the Air Security trade were also to be changed to force protection. This signified the end of many policing roles. Instead an investigation service was provided and a new focus primarily on providing security services to the RNZAF.

On 1 December 2014 all Military Police duties were removed from Force Protection and taken over by the newly established New Zealand Defence Force Military Police.

Security Forces

In March 2016 RNZAF command decided that the Force Protection name was a very broad concept and to better align itself with other western Air Forces, predominately the RAAF and USAF, a name change to RNZAF Security Forces was more appropriate. The new name also truly reflected the role of the unit.

On 1 July 2020 all military police personnel from the Security Forces officially transferred over to the RNZAF Police.

Selection and training 
Applicants attend a selection course in order to be considered for training on the sixteen-week Security Forces course. After initially completing the RNZAF Recruit Course, successful applicants then move on to Security Forces training which is conducted at RNZAF Base Woodbourne, where personnel learn advanced ground defence, physical fitness, patrolling, camouflage and concealment, bushcraft, survival techniques, base security, weapons, CBRN, and instructional techniques. On successful completion of the course trainees are then posted to an operational unit either at RNZAF Base Ohakea or RNZAF Base Auckland.

After two years posted to a unit and completion of the Security Forces Specialists course, Operators then obtain an increase in classification (moving up to LAC), and are redesignated as Security Forces Specialists where team members may move into Military Working Dogs if selected.

There is also the option to be posted to the RNZAF Survival, Evasion, Resistance, Escape (SERE) training Centre, and specialize in this area. In order to become an instructor at the SERE training center, Security Forces specialists need to complete courses in Australia, USA, Antarctica and numerous cold weather courses in the mountains of New Zealand.

Security Forces personnel complete military self defence courses annually. Personnel also complete heavy and light 4WD courses to ensure they are competent in all aspects of on/off-road driving.

SECFOR are also responsible for all drill and weapons training for RNZAF Personnel. Command and Recruit Training Squadron (CRTS) at RNZAF Base Woodbourne have a number of Security Forces Specialists to instruct and train officer cadets and recruits in their initial phases of training.

Insignia/nicknames
Following trade amalgamation in 1999/2000 Air Security Police moved to a blue brassard with white lettering displaying the name of 'Air Security Police'.

When the Air Security Trade transitioned to Force Protection, the trade adopted a square patch with a black field, blue border and the lettering FP in the center embroidered in white. The tradesmen and women were then referred to colloquially as FP’s.

The final iteration of the trade was the transition to Security Forces (SECFOR). The new trade insignia was based on the traditional Maori story of the ’battle of the birds’. In this story, as the piwakawaka approached the battle (representing the flying squadrons of the RNZAF), the Ruru escorted the Piwakawaka and protected the flanks. This was seen as representative of the RNZAF SECFOR role in contemporary operations.

The patch is circular in design with a bi-colored field. One diagonal half blue represents the “Air” component and the other colour green, representing the ground defence role of the trade. In the center is the Ruru in flight, grasping a Powhenua (traditionally a defensive weapon) in the ready position. The motto of the trade is ”Kaitiaki Kaha”, which literally translates to ”Strong Guardian”.

Role
Aircraft protection 
Airfield security 
Airfield terminal security 
Weapons training
Chemical, biological, radiological and nuclear training
Drill and ceremonial duties
Ground defence

Deployments

Security Forces is tasked with air transport security (ATSY), protecting airfields and RNZAF personnel, security duties, weapons instruction, drill instruction and CBRN training.

Air transport security missions and VIP flights aboard Air Force aircraft are a regular occurrence and exercises overseas have seen many team members of Security Forces travel extensively, both in New Zealand and throughout the world.

Organisation

A Security Forces unit is usually commanded by a junior officer such as a flight lieutenant and a Senior NCO such as flight sergeant acting as a 2IC. Sergeants then manage the Security Forces teams. Usually a corporal will command a four-man operational Security Forces team with a leading aircraftman (LAC) acting as the 2IC.

Equipment

Weapons
Light support weapon 7.62mm (LSW) FN Minimi
Glock 17 pistol
Lewis Machine and Tool Company MARS-L CQB16 rifle 
Benelli M3 shotgun

Non-lethal weapons 
 ASP expandable baton
 ASP handcuffs

Vehicles
 Mitsubishi Triton (fifth generation 4x4)
 Mercedes Benz Unimog
 Pinzgauer High-Mobility All-Terrain Vehicle
 Polaris RZR

See also
  -USAF Security Forces 
  -Royal Air Force Regiment
  -RAAF Airfield Defence Guards
  -German Air Force Regiment
  -RNZAF Police

References

Units and formations of the Royal New Zealand Air Force
Air force ground defence units and formations